The Black Belles is the debut studio album by American garage rock band the Black Belles, released on Third Man Records in 2011. The album spawned two singles, "Honky Tonk Horror" and "Wishing Well" (2012).

History
The Black Belles was recorded and produced by Jack White over the course of a few months. Bassist Ruby Rogers said about the recording "We did it really fast, and then we recorded it really fast too".

Editions
The Black Belles first edition is a 12-inch absinthe coloured vinyl album, the pressing limited to 300 copies in this color. There is also an unlimited black vinyl version as well as a CD version.

Track listing

Personnel
Olivia Jean – songwriter, vocals, guitar, organ, design
Ruby Rogers – songwriter (tracks: 2, 7), bass
Shelley Lynne – songwriter (track 4), drums
Christina "Lil' Boo" Norwood – synth
Lindsay Jane Hames – songwriter (track 4)
John Anthony Gillis – producer, mixing
Vance Powell – recording, mixing
Joshua V. Smith – assistant recording, assistant mixing
David Swanson – photography
Jo McCaughey – photography
Toni O'Neal – photography
Justin O'Neal – artwork, illustration, layout
Matthew Jacobson – layout

References

External links

2011 debut albums
Third Man Records albums
Albums produced by Jack White